Dicapo Opera Theatre was co-founded in 1981 by General Director Michael Capasso and Artistic Director Diane Martindale.  It suspended operations in 2013.

Programming and premieres 
Dicapo Opera Theatre’s presentations range from traditional repertoire to rarely performed operas, special opera-dance presentations, family events, and at least one contemporary work each season.  Its premieres have included the world premiere of Francesco Cilluffo’s Il caso Mortara, the American premiere of Donizetti’s Il campanello (The Night Bell) and the New York premieres of Oscar Straus’s The Merry Niebelungs, Richard Wargo’s A Chekhov Trilogy, Robert Ward’s Claudia Legare, and Tobias Picker's Thérèse Raquin, as well as the New York premiere of Lehár’s The Merry Widow with a contemporary libretto by the late Wendy Wasserstein.

Puccini at Dicapo 
Since its founding, Dicapo has been particularly dedicated to the music of Giacomo Puccini.  It gave the first performances anywhere of all three versions of Puccini’s Madama Butterfly (Milan, Brescia, and Paris) successively in one weekend.  With choreography by Dicapo’s Director of Dance Nilas Martins, Dicapo was the first to present music and dance presentations of Puccini’s Le Villi and The Mass, and has also presented settings of a number of Puccini songs and incidental music to dance.  By the end of 2008, the 150th anniversary of the composer’s birth, Dicapo Opera Theatre will have presented all of his major works, from Le Villi, the composer’s first opera, and orchestral works through his final opera, Turandot.

The theater 
Located on the lower level of St. Jean Baptiste Church at 184 East 76th Street in New York City, Dicapo Opera Theatre was completely remodelled in 1995 and is a fully equipped, 204-seat air-conditioned facility with orchestra pit, spacious lobby areas, offices and rehearsal spaces.

External links
 Dicapo Opera Theatre
 http://www.operacompetition.hu/english.asp?id=162

New York City opera companies
Musical groups established in 1981
1981 establishments in New York City